Presidential elections were held in Somaliland on 23 February 1997, the third indirect presidential election since the country declared its independence from Somalia in 1991. The elections took place towards the end of the Hargeisa Conference, held between October 1996 and February 1997. The election resulted in incumbent President Muhammad Haji Ibrahim Egal being reelected to a four-year term by a electoral college of elders who made up the national guurti(council of elders). Egal's closest competitor was Minister of Finance Suleiman Mohamoud Adan, who was also formerly in the cabinet of inaugural President  Abdirahman Ahmed Ali Tuur.

Background

Shortly after declaring its independence from Somalia in mid-1991, SNM Chairman Abdirahman Ahmed Ali Tuur was elected Somaliland’s first provisional president by clan elders. He held the position until 16 May 1993, when clan elders elected Mohamed Haji Ibrahim Egal to serve a two-year term as president of the country's first post-war civilian government. In May 1995, Egal’s term was extended for another 18 months. New elections were held on 23 February 1997.

Results

Aftermath

President Egal remained in office until his death in May 2002. He was succeeded in office by his Vice President, Dahir Riyale Kahin, who would go on to win the first direct presidential elections in 2003.

References

Elections in Somaliland
Indirect elections
Somaliland
1997 in Somaliland